The 2013 Ohio Bobcats football team represented Ohio University in the 2013 NCAA Division I FBS football season. They were led by ninth-year head coach Frank Solich and played their home games at Peden Stadium.  They are a member of the East Division of the Mid-American Conference (MAC). They finished the season 7–6, 4–4 in MAC play to finish in a tie for third place in the East Division. They were invited to the Beef 'O' Brady's Bowl where they lost to East Carolina.

Schedule

Source: Schedule

Awards
Devin Bass
All-MAC First Team Kickoff Return Specialist
All-MAC Second Team Defensive Back
1x MAC East Division Defensive Player of the Week (Week 3)

Travis Carrie
All-MAC First Team Punt Return Specialist
All-MAC Third Team Defensive Back

Donte Foster
All-MAC Second Team Wide Receiver

Thad Ingol
1x MAC East Division Defensive Player of the Week (Week 6)

Jovon Johnson
1x MAC East Division Defensive Player of the Week (Week 2)

Tyler Tettleton
1x MAC East Division Offensive Player of the Week (Week 8)

Josiah Yazdani
All-MAC Second Team Placekicker
1x MAC East Division Special Teams Player of the Week (Week 9)

References

Ohio
Ohio Bobcats football seasons
Ohio Bobcats football